is a Japanese politician, who has been serving as chairman of National Public Safety Commission in Shinzō Abe's cabinet since August 2007. He is a member of Liberal Democratic Party and member of the House of Councillors in the Diet of Japan (parliament).

Born in former town of Yoshii, Fukuoka, he graduated from Kyushu University with a degree in engineering. He was elected for the first time in 1992.

References

Members of the House of Councillors (Japan)
Living people
1937 births
Kyushu University alumni
Liberal Democratic Party (Japan) politicians